The 1978 Vuelta a España was the 33rd edition of the Vuelta a España, one of cycling's Grand Tours. The Vuelta began in Gijón, with a prologue individual time trial on 25 April, and Stage 10 occurred on 6 May with a stage from Calafell. The race finished in San Sebastián on 14 May.

Stage 11a
6 May 1978 — Calafell to Barcelona,

Stage 11b
6 May 1978 — Barcelona to Barcelona,  (ITT)

Stage 12

Stage 13
8 May 1978 — Igualada to Jaca,

Stage 14
9 May 1978 — Jaca to Logroño,

Stage 15
10 May 1978 — Logroño to Miranda de Ebro,

Stage 16

Stage 17
12 May 1978 — Ampuero to Bilbao,

Stage 18
13 May 1978 — Bilbao to Amurrio,

Stage 19a
14 May 1978 — Amurrio to San Sebastián,

Stage 19b
14 May 1978 — San Sebastián to San Sebastián (ITT)

Stage 19b was annulled.

References

1978 Vuelta a España
Vuelta a España stages